Tazmin is a female given name. Notable people with the name include:

Tazmin Brits (born 1991), South African cricketer
Tazmin Gray (born 1995), Australian rugby league footballer

Feminine given names